Cristian Chávez may refer to:

Sports
Cristian Gabriel Chávez (born 1987), Argentine football forward playing for Independiente
Cristian Manuel Chávez (born 1986), Argentine football midfielder playing for Wilstermann

Entertainers
Christian Chávez, Mexican singer and actor